The 1976 Georgia Bulldogs football team represented the Georgia Bulldogs of the University of Georgia during the 1976 NCAA Division I football season.

Schedule

Roster

Game summaries

Alabama

Source: 
    
    
    

Georgia's first win versus Alabama since 1965.

References

Georgia
Georgia Bulldogs football seasons
Southeastern Conference football champion seasons
Georgia Bulldogs football